Veljković's Family House is located Belgrade, Serbia, and has the status of cultural monument.

Importance 
The house of the Veljković family is one of the very few houses that before the Second World War, was famous both for its importance and respected owners, and for the interior architecture, family collection of paintings and sculptures, a private library, the collection of arms, and the utility items. Now, it's a representative example of the cultural heritage, surrounded by the various architecture of the town ambient, it reminds the passers-by of the old Belgrade. Due to small number of houses of the respected Belgrade families and being well preserved in their authentic form, the house of the Veljković family became the joint member of the European Historic Houses Association in 2009.

Architecture 
The original blueprints for the two-story family mansion, as well as the names of the architect and the contractor, were not saved. However, the title deed shows that the original owner of the lot with the buildings was Marko Čolić, who in 1866, sold it to the telegrapher Kosta Lazarević from Smederevo. In 1873, the property was resold to Franjo Všetački and his wife Ruža, and the new (present) house that they had built was purchased by Stojan Veljković in 1883. The house's walls are built of bricks laid in lime mortar bridged with architrave and occasionally, with shallow Prussian vaults. The exterior shows identical facades, simply designed in the architectural style of academism with reduced decorative ornaments. The layout is identical on both the ground and first floor. The ground floor contains a stately hall with a stairway with wrought-iron railings, and an anteroom providing access to the enfilade of three salons and two smaller rooms on the sides. One of the rooms served as a bathroom/closet and there was a separate toilet room. Apart from the main entrance, there is another one that led to a porch with massive columns and  decorative wooden eaves which provided access to a horse carriage or a car. In the courtyard, next to the family house, there was an auxiliary two-story building, intended for the horse stables on the ground floor and servants` accommodation upstairs. Later on, when the carriages were replaced by cars, the stable was converted into a garage. The main entrance to the building was from Birčaninova Street, and the second one, for the carriages and cars was from Kralja Milutina Street. In 1931, the exhibition pavilion was built in the spacious courtyard of the cultural monument, after the design by the architect Vojislav Đokić and the engineer Aleksandar Gavrilović. It was conceived in the spirit of modernism, and specially intended for the display of paintings and sculptures, a 255 m2 area with a glass roof, a central heating system, a special device for mounting the paintings and pedestals for the works of famous classical and renaissance sculptors.

The importance of the family members 
In the study of the social history of Serbia and urban elites of Belgrade in the late 19th and early 20th century, members of the Veljković Family were unavoidable, they were famous politicians, jurists and officers, who, by their education, political and military commitments and cultural engagement, had a huge influence on social, political, cultural and artistic life in Serbia. The founder of the family, Jovan Veljković, was the son of Veljko Miljković, the duke of Paraćin, and one of the leaders of the First Serbian Uprising led by Karađorđe, a colonel and a Minister of Justice. In 1832, in collusion with Prince Miloš, Jovan stirred up a rebellion in the nahiye (administrative unit) of Paraćin. As a result, six more nahiyes were returned to Serbia in compliance with the Treaty of Bucharest of 1812. In his old age, he joined the barricades during the bombing of Belgrade in 1862. Under Prince Aleksandar Karađorđević he served as the Minister of Finance. Privately, he was a weapons collector and a subscriber to the first editions of the Belgrade newspaper. His eldest son, Jevrem, aide-de-camp to Prince Mihailo, was trained at the Prussian Military Academy, took part in the activities of the United Serbian Youth and was known as a great lover of literature. He continued his father's tradition and passion for collecting weapons and for literature. The younger son Stojan received his doctoral degree in law in Heidelberg and pursued postdoctoral studies in Berlin and Paris. He served as minister of justice, president of the Court of Cassation and, with Jovan Ristić, the leader of the Liberals and a diplomat, drew up the Constitution of 1859. He taught Roman and criminal law at the Belgrade Great School. As the Minister of Justice, he was responsible for the enactment of the Agrarian Reform Law which provided for the economic independence of the peasants in the newly liberated regions of Serbia. Prestigious European universities were alma maters for the next generation of the family as well, a privilege of the few in Serbia at the time. Stojan had two sons, Jovan and Vojislav. Jovan graduated from the Military Academy, served as King Milan's aide-de-camp and fought in the First World War. The younger Vojislav, the “father of the Yugoslav golden dinar”, received his doctoral degree in law from the Sorbonne with highest honours. He was the professor of the Administrative law at the Lyceum, a Serbia's delegate to the First Hague Peace Conference, and a secretary to King Aleksandar Obrenović. After the First World War, in 1919, he served as the Minister of Finance under Regent Aleksandar Karađorđević. In the newly created Kingdom of Serbs, Croats and Slovenes (SCS) marked by monetary instability and currency chaos, Vojislav Veljković developed a new monetary system and carried out currency reform. The Ministry of Finance he headed introduced a single currency: the dinar. His activity in the area of monetary policy and public purse management includes the law on the central bank of the Kingdom of SCS passed in 1920. Later that year, after great professional success, he withdrew from politics and devoted himself to the Serbian Literary Herald as one of its founders, and to collecting art. Inspired by Palazzo Medici, he had the headquarters of the Vračar Cooperative Bank built (today housing the Embassy of Turkey), and in its courtyard, an atelier for the painter Beta Vukanović, his advisor on new acquisitions for his art collection. His home at 21 Birčaninova Street was a venue for prominent writers, artists, scientists and politicians, such as Jovan Cvijić, Jaša Prodanović, Paja Jovanović, Uroš Predić and many others. Stojan V. Veljković was an industrialist and a co-owner of a Steam mill and a brewery with his brother.

Descendants 
Their living descendants are Bogdan V. Veljković, graduated at Harvard and the current president of the Association for Restitution of Nationalised Property and his sister, Katarina Veljković, a Russian literature professor.

Legacy 
The rich family legacy was kept in the house of the Veljković family through the care of several generations: antique weapons, military atlases, old books and magazines, furniture, objects d’art. The most important and the largest part of the collection consisted of artworks of about 250 domestic and foreign masters of the academic realism: Rista Vukanović and Beta Vukanović, Veljko Stanojević, Dragutin Glišić, Ljubomir Ivanović, Uroš Predić, Paja Jovanović, Marko Murat, and about 30 artists of French, English, Scottish, Italian and Japanese origin, distinguished members of the Association of French Artists who exhibited their works at the Salon of Paris between the two world wars, and from where the Veljković family purchased the paintings. On the whole, the collection, encompassing Serbian and foreign artists of the epoch, was unique in Belgrade in terms of the number and the value of the artworks and the prominence of the authors, even compared with large museum collections (21 casts of Michelangelo's sculptures...). This was the reason why the Veljković family constructed the modern exhibition pavilion in the courtyard of the family house, which at the time of its construction was the first private museum in the Balkans. After the outbreak of the Second World War, the museum was closed, and after the war, it was used as an atelier, at first by Moša Pijade and then by a sculptor Sreten Stojanović. After the pavilion was nationalized, the bronzes from the collection were handed over to the Academy of Fine Arts, and space gradually ceased to serve its original purpose.

The house of the Veljković family, on the corner of Birčaninova and Kralja Milutina Street, reflects the development of the urban architecture in the 19th century and the adoption of the European stylistic models important to understanding the evolution and modernization of Serbian society at the turn of the century. For its cultural, historical architectural and townscape values the House of the Veljković family was designated as a cultural property.

See more 
 List of buildings in Belgrade

References

External links 

 Institute for the Protection of Cultural Monuments - Belgrade
 List of monuments

Houses in Serbia
Protected Monuments of Culture
Buildings and structures in Belgrade
Savski Venac